Tammy Gillis is a Canadian actress who works on television and film projects across the country.

Early life and education
Gillis was born in 1971 in Dauphin, Manitoba. She studied pre-law at the University of Manitoba.

Career
Tammy Gillis grew up in rural Manitoba and got her start on the stage in her hometown playing Grandpa in her first school play.  While attending University, she was discovered by a modelling agency. Shortly after signing with them, she booked a series of commercials for Greenkids starring Lyle Lovett and landed her first film role in the award-winning short film The Heart of the World directed by cult film director, Guy Maddin.

Her onscreen credits include roles in White Noise 2 starring Nathan Fillion and Shooter starring Mark Wahlberg. Tammy played a leading role in the indie feature film Under the Apple Box, which received an honorable mention at the New Jersey Film Festival and also screened at the Women's International Film Festival in Miami in March 2013.  She appeared on the Bravo series Girlfriend's Guide to Divorce, as well as the  romantic comedy A Novel Romance starring alongside Amy Acker and Dylan Bruce and the Lifetime thriller Stolen from the Womb starring alongside Laura Mennell and Larisa Oleynik.

She has guest starred on CTV's drama Motive as well as her recurring guest starring role on the HBO Canada series Less Than Kind and the Douglas Coupland CBC comedy "jPod" TV series Less than Kind. She has appeared in roles on the CW's Supernatural, Showcase's Lost Girl, SpikeTV's Blue Mountain State, Showcase's Endgame, Reaper, The L Word, and the final season of Battlestar Galactica. and many more. Her MOW's include Stealing Paradise starring Rachel Leigh Cook, The Mermaid Chair starring Kim Basinger and Home by Christmas starring Linda Hamilton.

Gillis was a spokesmodel for Canadian underwear company Ginch Gonch. She travelled with the line to France, to El Salvador and Russia. She was named one of Femme Fatale's 'Fresh Faces of the Year' in 2007 and has been seen in the magazines UMM and Sharp for Men.

In 2016, Gillis appeared in the sixth season of ABC's Once Upon a Time as Jill.

Gillis appeared in the Hallmark Channel original movie Frozen in Love, which stars Rachael Leigh Cook and Niall Matter. The film was broadcast on the channel in January 2018. As of 2018, she is currently playing a police officer named Marissa Staub in Freeform’s drama-fantasy series Siren.

Filmography

Film

Television

References

External links
 
 

Year of birth missing (living people)
Living people
Canadian television actresses
Canadian film actresses
21st-century Canadian actresses
Actresses from Manitoba
University of Manitoba alumni
People from Dauphin, Manitoba